Rasheed Masood (15 August 1947 – 5 October 2020) 
was an Indian politician who was a 9 time MP, 5 time Lok Sabha and 4 time Rajya Sabha member and was an Indian politician, a member of the Indian National Congress party and a member of the Lok Sabha representing  Saharanpur constituency in Uttar Pradesh. He was known to be a one of successful politicians of Uttar Pradesh. He was a state health minister and he was also the United National Progressive Alliance candidate for the  vice-president in the 10 August 2007 election and placed third with 75 votes.

Life 

He earned B.Sc. and LLM from Aligarh Muslim University. Masood was an agriculturist by profession. He was general secretary of Bharatiya Lok Dal between 1975 and 1977. He was elected to the 6th Lok Sabha for the first time on a Janata Party ticket in the post-emergency polls in 1977. He went on to become the treasurer of the Janata Parliamentary Party between 1979 and 1980.
 
Masood was re-elected to the 7th Lok Sabha on a Lok Dal ticket in the 1980 polls. After being the chief whip of Lok Dal in 1982, he became the deputy leader of Lok Dal Parliamentary Party for more than a year. He was the member of the Rajya Sabha from 1986 to '89. From 1989 to '91, he was a member of the 9th Lok Sabha. From April to November 1990, he was Minister of Health and Family Welfare (Independent Charge) in the V P Singh government. In 1991 he was re-elected to the 10th Lok Sabha.
 
In the late eighties, he was associated with Janata Party and was its deputy Parliamentary party leader. In the nineties, he joined the Samajwadi Party. He was the member of the 14th Lok Sabha from 2004 to 2009. In 2010, he was re-elected to the Rajya Sabha.

On 12 December 2011, he resigned from the Rajya Sabha (Upper House) and from the Samajwadi Party and joined INC. He was elected as the special member of CWC (Congress Working Committee). He became  the chairman of APEDA  on 4 April 2013 for a term of 3 years.

On 5 October 2020, Masood died from complications of COVID-19 during the COVID-19 pandemic in India.

Elections Contested

Lok Sabha

Corruption allegations and conviction

On 19 September 2013, a Special CBI court held Rasheed Masood guilty in a case of corruption and other offences. He was held guilty of fraudulently nominating undeserving candidates to MBBS seats allotted to Tripura in medical colleges across the country from the central pool.

On 1 October 2013, Rasheed was sentenced to four years in jail. As a result of the conviction, he was disqualified from the Parliament of India. He, thus got the dubious distinction of becoming the first elected member of parliament to be disqualified from the Parliament of India, in the entire history of the Republic of India. He was serving as a member of parliament, representing the Congress Party, to the upper house of the Indian parliament when the verdict was pronounced and his membership stripped.

References 

|-

|-

|-

|-

|-

External links 

 Official biographical sketch in Parliament of India website
 Masood is UNPA candidate for Vice Presidential poll
 Masood UNPA candidate, VP poll likely to be triangular
 Rasheed Masood: Veteran of many a poll battle 

1947 births
2020 deaths
Indian Muslims
People from Saharanpur district
India MPs 2004–2009
Aligarh Muslim University alumni
Samajwadi Party politicians
Janata Dal politicians
Indian National Congress politicians
Janata Party politicians
Indian vice-presidential candidates
India MPs 1977–1979
India MPs 1980–1984
India MPs 1989–1991
India MPs 1991–1996
Indian politicians convicted of crimes
Lok Sabha members from Uttar Pradesh
Criminals from Uttar Pradesh
Rajya Sabha members from Uttar Pradesh
Health ministers of India
Indian politicians disqualified from office
Deaths from the COVID-19 pandemic in India